Ek Baar Phir (translation: Once Again) is a 1979 film produced and directed by Vinod Pande. This offbeat social drama casts Suresh Oberoi and Deepti Naval as lead pair with Saeed Jaffrey, Chitto Chopra, Pradeep Verma, Vinod Pande in support cast. It was the first Indian-language film to be made in England.

The story is about the incompatibility between a film star husband and a traditional wife resulting in an extra-marital relationship.

Critical Reception

The film was later featured in Avijit Ghosh's book, 40 Retakes: Bollywood Classics You May have Missed. Ek Baar Phir was described as "a bold movie that refreshingly speaks out for women's freedom of choice in a failed marriage at a time when Bollywood was still making Maang Bharo Sajna."

Plot
Kalpana (Deepti Naval), a middle class girl, is excited about her marriage with a film star Mahendar Kumar (Suresh Oberoi). The star is busy with his profession and is a flirt. Kalpana learns this after marriage and finds Mahendar has no time to spend with her. Both happen to visit London on Mahendar's project. There she meets a young student Vimal (Pradeep Verma), studying arts at London University, who makes art works of the people around and exhibits them. He requests Kalpana for a sketch, which she obliges. They meet very often and fall in love with each other. With him, Kalpana sees the new phase and joy of life, which she has not seen earlier. They get intimate and Kalpana fells guilty about this. She stops meeting Vimal for some time. One day she finds a letter from Vimal and replies him. She starts meeting him again and finds herself swaying between Mahendar and Vimal. At this juncture, she decides to break away from Mahendar and joins Vimal to lead a joyful life. The rest story shows the turn of events thereafter, in the lives of Mahendar, Kalpana and Vimal.

Cast
Suresh Oberoi as  Mahender Kumar
Deepti Naval as  Kalpana Kumar
Saeed Jaffrey as Saeed
Pradeep Verma
Avtar Singh
Chitto Chopra
Collin Alexander
Dilip
Kalpana Pandya
Kinsan
Krishan Gould
Leena Patel
Mansur
Maria
Meenu Budhwar
Mohammed
Paravati Meharaj
Prem Prakash
Salim Shaikh
Vinod Gurani
Vinod Pande
Wasim Siddiqui
Yolande
Zubair Zalaria

Release
The film had its gala opening at the Liberty West End cinema on Edgware Road in London on 28 July 1979.

Soundtrack

References

External links

1979 films
1970s Hindi-language films